USS Hazleton (SP-1770) was a United States Navy patrol vessel in commission from August to December 1918.

Hazleton was built as a private motorboat of the same name in 1917 by the Great Lakes Boat Building Corporation at Milwaukee, Wisconsin. On 19 September 1917, the U.S. Navy chartered her from her owner, G. B. Markle of Hazleton, Pennsylvania, for use as a section patrol boat during World War I. Enrolled in the Naval Coast Defense Reserve at Milwaukee, she was taken to Newport, Rhode Island to be fitted out for naval service. She was commissioned at Newport as USS Hazleton (SP-1770) on 25 August 1918.

Assigned to the 2nd Naval District in southern New England, Hazleton served as a dispatch boat in the Newport area for the rest of World War I. The Navy returned her to Markle on 10 December 1918.

References

SP-1770 Hazleton at Department of the Navy Naval History and Heritage Command Online Library of Selected Images: U.S. Navy Ships -- Listed by Hull Number: "SP" #s and "ID" #s -- World War I Era Patrol Vessels and other Acquired Ships and Craft numbered from ID # 1700 through ID # 1799
NavSource Online: Section Patrol Craft Photo Archive Hazleton (SP 1770)

Patrol vessels of the United States Navy
World War I patrol vessels of the United States
Ships built in Milwaukee
1917 ships